Martin Bau (born 8 October 1994) is a Slovenian swimmer. He competed in the men's 1500 metre freestyle event at the 2016 Summer Olympics.

References

External links
 

1994 births
Living people
Slovenian male freestyle swimmers
Olympic swimmers of Slovenia
Swimmers at the 2016 Summer Olympics
Swimmers at the 2013 Mediterranean Games
Swimmers at the 2018 Mediterranean Games
Sportspeople from Maribor
Mediterranean Games competitors for Slovenia
Swimmers at the 2020 Summer Olympics